Short track speed skating at the 2016 Winter Youth Olympics was held at the Gjøvik Olympic Cavern Hall in Gjøvik, Norway from 14 to 20 February.

Medal summary

Medal table

Events

Boys' events

Girls' events

Mixed events

Qualification system
Each nation could send a maximum of 4 athletes (2 boys and 2 girls). The top 3 nations in the overall classification of the 2015 World Junior Short Track Speed Skating Championships could send 2 athletes per gender, the next best nations could send 1 athlete per gender until the quota was filled. The quota limit was 32. The current allocation of quotas is listed below.

Qualification summary

References

External links
Results Book – Short track speed skating

 
2016 in short track speed skating
2016 Winter Youth Olympics events
2016